Arthur Kreindler (15 May 1900 – 28 May 1988) was a Romanian neurologist of Jewish origin, academic, professor of neurology at the Carol Davila University of Medicine and Pharmacy in Bucharest, and director of the Institute of Neurology Research of the Romanian Academy.

Bibliography 
 A. Kreindler (ed.), Epilepsia. Cercetări clinice și experimentale, Editura Academiei Republicii Populare Romîne'', 1955.

References

1900 births
1988 deaths
Romanian Jews
Titular members of the Romanian Academy
Academic staff of the Carol Davila University of Medicine and Pharmacy
Romanian neurologists